Tamara Faith Berger is a Canadian author and novelist. She is best known for her novel Maidenhead, which won the Believer Book Award in 2012. Berger is a self-described feminist.

After completing her bachelor's degree, she worked as a writer of pornographic stories.  Her themes include women's desire and sexuality, often describing obscene scenarios. Many of her novels explore issues of race and class. Her literary influences include Georges Bataille and Judy Blume.

Her debut novel Lie With Me was adapted into a 2006 film by her husband, the filmmaker Clement Virgo.

Her novel Queen Solomon was shortlisted for the 2019 ReLit Award for fiction.

Bibliography
 Lie With Me (2001)
 The Way of the Whore (2004)
 A Woman Alone at Night (2007)
 Maidenhead (2012)
 Kuntalini (2016)
 Queen Solomon (2018)

References

Living people
21st-century Canadian novelists
Canadian women novelists
Believer Book Award winners
Year of birth missing (living people)
21st-century Canadian women writers